Jan Wessel Hegg (born 1 September 1938) is a Norwegian diplomat.

He holds the siv.øk. degree from the Norwegian School of Economics. He served as embassy counsellor in Italy before becoming subdirector in the Ministry of Foreign Affairs in 1988. In 1992 he was promoted to head of department. He was then posted as Norway's ambassador to Greece in 1994, Indonesia in 1998 and Latvia in 2004. He retired in 2004.

Hegg resides at Øvrevoll. He is a distant relative of Peter Wessel.

References

1938 births
Living people
Norwegian School of Economics alumni
Norwegian civil servants
Norwegian expatriates in Italy
Ambassadors of Norway to Greece
Ambassadors of Norway to Indonesia
Ambassadors of Norway to Latvia